Vem är det, with the subtitle Svensk biografisk handbok, is a Swedish "Who's Who" biographical reference publication which has been published in 46 editions since 1912.

References

External links
Vem är det at Project Runeberg 

Swedish biographical dictionaries